1,4-Cyclohexadiene is an organic compound with the formula C6H8.  It is a colourless, flammable liquid that is of academic interest as a prototype of a large class of related compounds called terpenoids, an example being γ-terpinene. An isomer of this compound is 1,3-cyclohexadiene.

Synthesis and reactions
In the laboratory, substituted 1,4-cyclohexadienes are synthesized by Birch reduction of related aromatic compounds using an alkali metal dissolved in liquid ammonia and a proton donor such as an alcohol. In this way, over reduction to the fully saturated ring is avoided. 
 
1,4-Cyclohexadiene and its derivatives are easily aromatized, the driving force being the formation of an aromatic ring.  The conversion to an aromatic system may be used to trigger other reactions, such as the Bergman cyclization.

References

External links
 The photochemistry of 1,4-cyclohexadiene in solution and in the gas phase
 NIST Chemistry WebBook Reaction thermochemistry data

Cyclohexadienes